Trampolino al campo Smith was a K40 ski jumping hill located in Bardonecchia, Italy.

History 
On 21 February 1909, Harald Smith set the only official world record on this hill at 43 metres (141 feet).

Ski jumping world record

References

External links
Trampolino al campo Smith skisprungschanzen.com

Ski jumping venues in Italy
Bardonecchia